John Richard Ryan (24 April 1911 – 12 September 1988) was an Australian politician who represented the South Australian House of Assembly seats of Port Adelaide from 1959 to 1970 and Price from 1970 to 1975 for the Labor Party. He served as Speaker of the South Australian House of Assembly for the Don Dunstan Labor government from 1973 to 1975. Prior to parliament he was a waterside worker and a Licensed Customs and Shipping Agent.

References

 

Members of the South Australian House of Assembly
Australian Labor Party members of the Parliament of South Australia
1911 births
1988 deaths
20th-century Australian politicians